The Shiloh Meeting House and Cemetery is a historic Presbyterian meeting house and cemetery located near Ireland in Madison Township, Dubois County, Indiana.  It was built in 1849, and is a simple one-story, rectangular frame building with Greek Revival style design elements. It has a gable front roof and rests on a sandstone pier foundation.  Also on the property is a contributing cemetery.

It was added to the National Register of Historic Places in 1982.

Gallery

References

Presbyterian churches in Indiana
Churches on the National Register of Historic Places in Indiana
Greek Revival church buildings in Indiana
Churches completed in 1849
Churches in Dubois County, Indiana
1849 establishments in Indiana
National Register of Historic Places in Dubois County, Indiana
Wooden churches in Indiana